Barcarole in der Nacht is the tenth German single recorded by U. S. entertainer Connie Francis. The B-side was Colombino.

Both songs had been written especially in German for Francis since it had become clear after her previous nine German singles that compositions of German origin were favored by the German audiences to cover versions of Francis' U. S. hits.

"Barcarole in der Nacht" peaked at # 1 of the German charts and remains a fan favorite.

Francis overdubbed Italian vocals to the orchestral playback of "Colombino" on May 7, 1962; this recording, however, remains unreleased to this day.

References

1963 singles
Connie Francis songs
1963 songs
MGM Records singles
Songs with lyrics by Kurt Feltz
Songs written by Werner Scharfenberger